Cinzana is a village and rural commune in the Cercle of Ségou in the Ségou Region of southern-central Mali. The commune includes 71 villages in an area of approximately 1,050 square kilometers. In the 2009 census it had a population of 36,440. The Bani River runs along the southern boundary of the commune. The village of Cinzana lies 41 km southeast of Ségou.

References

External links
.
.

Communes of Ségou Region